Nossa Senhora do Rosário ("Our Lady of the Rosary") is a bairro in the District of Sede in the municipality of Santa Maria, in the Brazilian state of Rio Grande do Sul. It is located in Central Santa Maria.

Villages 
The bairro contains the following villages: Beco do Otávio, Loteamento Noêmio Lemos, Rosário, Vila Bortola, Vila Menna Barreto, Vila Oficina Ramos, Vila Osvaldo Beck.

Gallery of photos

References 

Bairros of Santa Maria, Rio Grande do Sul